An incomplete list of schools in Paraguay:



 Type: PU – Public, PR – Private, PS – Private-Subsidized
 Yes – If the institution have the program
 No – If the institution does not have the program
 EMD – Enseñanza Media Diversificada

Asunción

Public

Private

See also
 List of universities in Paraguay
 List of schools by country

Paraguay

High schools